The 1997 Hanes 500 was the 27th stock car race of the 1997 NASCAR Winston Cup Series and the 49th iteration of the event. The race was originally scheduled to held on Sunday, September 28, 1997, but was postponed until Monday, September 29 due to inclement weather. The race took place in Ridgeway, Virginia at Martinsville Speedway, a  permanent oval-shaped short track. The race took the scheduled 500 laps to complete. In the late stages of the race, Roush Racing driver Jeff Burton would manage to take advantage of a penalty-stricken Rusty Wallace to take his third career NASCAR Winston Cup Series victory and his third and final victory of the season. To fill out the top three, Richard Childress Racing driver Dale Earnhardt and Petty Enterprises driver Bobby Hamilton would finish second and third, respectively.

Background 

Martinsville Speedway is an NASCAR-owned stock car racing track located in Henry County, in Ridgeway, Virginia, just to the south of Martinsville. At 0.526 miles (0.847 km) in length, it is the shortest track in the NASCAR Cup Series. The track was also one of the first paved oval tracks in NASCAR, being built in 1947 by H. Clay Earles. It is also the only remaining race track that has been on the NASCAR circuit from its beginning in 1948.

Entry list 

 (R) denotes rookie driver.

Qualifying 
Qualifying was split into two rounds. The first round was held on Friday, September 26. Each driver would have one lap to set a time. During the first round, the top 25 drivers in the round would be guaranteed a starting spot in the race. If a driver was not able to guarantee a spot in the first round, they had the option to scrub their time from the first round and try and run a faster lap time in a second round qualifying run, held on Saturday, September 27. As with the first round, each driver would have one lap to set a time. Positions 26-38 would be decided on time, and depending on who needed it, the 39th thru either the 42nd, 43rd, or 44th position would be based on provisionals. Four spots are awarded by the use of provisionals based on owner's points. The fifth is awarded to a past champion who has not otherwise qualified for the race. If no past champion needs the provisional, the field would be limited to 42 cars. If a champion needed it, the field would expand to 43 cars. If the race was a companion race with the NASCAR Winston West Series, four spots would be determined by NASCAR Winston Cup Series provisionals, while the final two spots would be given to teams in the Winston West Series, leaving the field at 44 cars.

Three drivers would fail to qualify: Gary Bradberry, Morgan Shepherd, and Dave Marcis.

Full qualifying results 

*Time not available.

Race results

References 

1997 NASCAR Winston Cup Series
NASCAR races at Martinsville Speedway
September 1997 sports events in the United States
1997 in sports in Virginia